Radu Mihăileanu (born 23 April 1958) is a Romanian-born French film director and screenwriter of Jewish origin. He left Romania in 1980 and graduated the IDHEC cinematographic institute in Paris.  In addition to his work in the cinema he published a book of poems in 1987 titled Une vague en mal de mer. His film The Source premiered in competition at the 2011 Cannes Film Festival.

In 2009, he signed a petition in support of film director Roman Polanski, calling for his release after Polanski was arrested in Switzerland in relation to his 1977 charge for drugging and raping a 13-year-old girl.

Filmography

References

External links 

 

Politicians from Bucharest
Romanian film directors
Romanian screenwriters
Romanian film producers
Chevaliers of the Légion d'honneur
French film directors
French screenwriters
French film producers
Romanian emigrants to France
1958 births
Living people
Officiers of the Ordre des Arts et des Lettres